Shir Betar (in English: "The Betar Song") is a poem written by the Zionist leader Zeev Jabotinsky in Paris in 1932. The Shir Betar was immediately adopted as the song of the Zionist youth movement Betar. Through the Shir Betar, Jabotinsky made a call to all Jews to recover their self-esteem and to actively participate in the fight for the creation of a Jewish nation.

External links 
Hebrew version of the Shir Betar
Betar song lyrics
Shir Betar performed by Israeli orchestra
Shir Betar influence in Israeli society
Use of the Shir Betar in the Warsaw Ghetto uprising during the Holocaust

Zionism
Betar
Ze'ev Jabotinsky
1932 poems
Jewish poetry